David Geoffrey White (born 5 August 1967) is a former English cricketer.  White was a right-handed batsman who bowled right-arm medium-fast.  He was born at Horwich, Lancashire.

White represented the Lancashire Cricket Board in a single List A match against the Netherlands in the 1999 NatWest Trophy.  In his only List A match, he scored 1 run and with the ball he bowled 3 wicket-less overs.

References

External links
David White at Cricinfo
David White at CricketArchive

1967 births
Living people
People from Horwich
Cricketers from Bolton
English cricketers
Lancashire Cricket Board cricketers